Expedition Lambaréné was a Czechoslovak student expedition to the hospital of Albert Schweitzer in Lambaréné.  Its goal was to bring medicine there. The expedition started from the Old Town Square, Prague on January 1, 1968, at 10:23 am and returned to Prague in August 1968.  It lasted 257 days and travelled more than 35,000 km in its Tatra 138 Vn 6×6.

Members 

 Petr Bartůněk: organizer, leader, and doctor
 Miloslav Topinka: psychologist
 Josef Vavroušek: navigator and mechanic
 Luboš Kropáček: interpreter
 Jiří Plaček: chief driver and mechanic
 Klement Kunz: cook
 Jiří Stöhr: cameraman and photographer
 Petr Bárta: correspondent

The Tatra model 

A specially modified truck "Tatra 138 6×6 VN - Lambaréné" was made in a Tatra factory in Kopřivnice. Today it is there on display in its museum.

The route 
Prague – Rijeka – Cairo – Aswan – Khartoum – Addis Abeba – Nairobi – Kilima-Njaro – Dar es Salaam – Lusaka – Livingstone – Lusaka – Kinshasa – Brazzaville – Pointe-Noire – Libreville – Douala – Lagos – In-Salah – Algiers – Marseille – Paris – Munich – Prague

The government of Gabon did not allow the expedition to enter the country, and so they did not reach the hospital.  The members met the hospital representatives in Libreville, however, during a stopover of the ship General Mangin in the local harbour.

External links 
 The expedition's Tatra in the Tatra Museum, Kopřivnice

1968 in Czechoslovakia
African expeditions
1968 in Gabon